was a Japanese immunologist who, with his wife Teruko Ishizaka, discovered the antibody class Immunoglobulin E (IgE) in 1966–1967. Their work was regarded as a major breakthrough in the understanding of allergy. He was awarded the 1973 Gairdner Foundation International Award and the 2000 Japan Prize for his work in immunology.

Early life and education 
Ishizaka was born in Tokyo to Koki and Kiku Ishizaka. His father was a career soldier who retired in 1933 as a lieutenant general.
Ishizaka obtained his medical qualifications and PhD in 1948 from the University of Tokyo. He "was captivated by immunology while taking a summer course in college" and abandoned plans to become a physician.

Career
From 1953 to 1962, he headed the immunoserology division at the department of serology at the Japanese National Institute of Health. During his tenure in that position he spent two years as a research fellow at Caltech (1957–1959).

In 1962, Ishizaka and his wife Teruko were recruited by Sam Bukantz, medical director of the Children's Asthma Research Institute and Hospital (CARIH), and moved to Denver, Colorado. He assumed the post of assistant professor of microbiology at the University of Colorado Medical School, as well as chief of immunology of its associated Children's Asthma Research Institute and CARIH. In 1965, he was promoted to associate professor at University of Colorado Denver.

While at Denver, the Ishizakas discovered the antibody class Immunoglobulin E (IgE) in 1966–1967 and its interplay with mast cells. They demonstrated the IgE's critical role in mediating the release of histamine from mast cells. The discovery of IgE is considered a milestone in immunology and the understanding of allergy.

In 1970, Ishizaka was appointed as O'Neill Professor of Medicine and Microbiology at Johns Hopkins University School of Medicine in Baltimore, Maryland, as well as professor of biology at the Faculty of Arts and Science. From 1982 to 1986, he served as president of the Collegium International Allergologicum. He was elected a foreign associate of the United States National Academy of Sciences in 1983. Ishaka remained at the university until 1989, when he became scientific director, and then president in 1990, of the La Jolla Institute for Allergy and Immunology in La Jolla, California.

After retiring in 1996, he returned to Japan and served as honorary director of the Institute of Immunology at Yamagata University.

Recognition 
The Ishizakas received numerous awards for their work in allergy and immunology. In 1972, they received the Passano Foundation Award. In 1973, he received the German Paul Ehrlich and Ludwig Darmstaedter Prize, the Takeda Medical Award, the first Scientific Achievement Award of the International Association of Allergology and together received the Gairdner Foundation International Award. In 1974, he received the Asahi Cultural Award, the Imperial Prize of the Japan Academy, and the Japanese Order of Culture. In 1979, they received the Borden Award. In 2000, he was awarded the 16th Japan Prize.

Personal life and death 
Ishizaka was married to Teruko Ishizaka, his partner in many of their discoveries. He died of heart failure at the age of 92 on 6 July 2018 at Yamagata University Hospital in Yamagata, Yamagata.

References

External links 
 La Jolla Institute for Allergy & Immunology

1925 births
2018 deaths
Japanese immunologists
University of Tokyo alumni
Johns Hopkins University faculty
Recipients of the Order of the Sacred Treasure
Recipients of the Order of Culture
Foreign associates of the National Academy of Sciences
University of Colorado Denver faculty
Japanese expatriates in the United States
Physicians from Tokyo
California Institute of Technology fellows